Personal names in Malaysia vary greatly according to ethno-cultural group. Personal names are, to a certain degree, regulated by the national registration department, especially since the introduction of the National Registration Identity Card (NRIC).

The Malaysian Chinese are generally the only major ethnic group in Malaysia to use family names, though some Malay families use surnames as well. Most other groups, including the ethnic Malays, Orang Asli and the Bumiputera of Sabah and Sarawak, generally share a naming custom that includes the use of a personal name followed by a patronym name.

Malay names
Traditional Malay names were taken from one of a number of languages, or even a combination of two or more elements from these languages:
 Malay such as Intan, Melati, Kiambang or Tuah
 Khmer, Siamese or Cham such as Tam, Som or Lai
 Javanese such as Ratnasari, Joyo or Kesuma
 Sanskrit or Pali such as Wira, Darma or Wati

Malay names are not to be confused with Malaysian names. Malay names also exist in various countries other than Malaysia, including among the ethnic Malay communities in Brunei, Indonesia, Singapore, South Africa (Cape Malays) and Thailand.
  
Arabic names were introduced later along with Islam names but did not become dominant among commoners until the colonial era. Although traditional Malay names were still widely used for centuries afterward, they are now primarily confined to rural areas. Malaysia's National Registration Department doesn't allow names which they deem to have negative or obscene meanings, such as Pendek which means short. The Department additionally bans names with the meaning of colors, animals and natural phenomena. This effectively renders many traditional names illegal including Puteh or Putih (white), Bulan (moon), Suria (sun), Rimau (tiger) and Awan (cloud). Because of these restrictions, the vast majority of Malays today tend to favour Arabic names. However, names from the following languages are common as well:

 Persian such as Jihan, Mirza or Shah 
 Greek or Latin such as Maria, Marina or Johana 
 English, such as Tiara, Orked (from the English "orchid") or Ros (from "rose")

Names of Arabo-Hebrew origins are also common, for example Adam, Yaakob, Ishak, Bunyamin and Danial and Sarah. In addition, names of Arabo-Hebrew origins that seldom used by Muslim Arabs are widespread among Malays, such as the female names of Saloma and Rohana.

In pre-modern times, words and names of Arabic derivation were adapted to suit the Classical Malay language. This is still reflected in the rural pronunciation of certain Middle Eastern names. Thus, Sharif would be Sarip and Aziz would become Ajis.

Structure
A Malay's name consists of a personal name, which is used to address them in all circumstances, almost always followed by a patronym. Thus, most Malays do not use family names or surnames. In this respect, Malay names are similar to Icelandic naming conventions. For men, the patronym consists of the title bin (from the Arabic , meaning 'son of') followed by his father's personal name. If Osman has a son called Musa, Musa will be known as Musa bin Osman. For women, the patronym consists of the title binti (from the Arabic , meaning 'daughter of') followed by her father's name. Thus, if Musa has a daughter called Aisyah, Aisyah will be known as Aisyah binti Musa. Upon marriage, a woman does not change her name, as is done in many cultures.

In the past it was uncommon for a Malay to have more than one personal name, but in modern times Malay names may consist of two and sometimes three personal names.

As of January 2022, the longest recorded name for a Malaysian is 'Princess Aura Nurr Ermily Amara Auliya Bidadari Nawal El-Zendra', comprising 63 letters including spaces.

Some are taken from public figures around the world, such as Mohammad Rifae Zidane, whose third personal name is taken from the famous footballer. Some people have names from other languages that have a different Malay meaning. For example, the daughter of actor Scha Alyahya and Awal Ashaari, named Lara Alana, faced criticism from Malaysians because "Lara" means "painful", although it means "protector" in Latin.

Patronymic
The patronymic is employed by almost all Malays in accordance with local customs as well as ones adopted from the Arabs, Hebrews and others. Sometimes the title part of the patronymic, Bin or Binti, is reduced to B. for men, or to Bt., Bte. or Bint. for women. Foreigners sometimes take this abbreviation erroneously for a middle initial. In general practice, most Malays omit the title Bin or Binti from their names. Therefore, the two examples from the paragraph above would be known as Musa Osman and Aisyah Musa. When presented in this way, the second part of the name is often mistaken by foreigners for a family name.

When someone is referred to using only one name, the first name is always used, never the second (because it would be rude to call someone by his or her father's name). Thus, Musa Osman is Mr Musa (or Encik Musa in Malay), and Aisyah Musa is Mrs/Ms/Miss Aisyah (or Puan/Cik Aisyah in Malay). Occasionally, however, a man's personal name comes after the Islamic prophet Mohammed's name, or the word Abdul. In such a case, the man will usually be referred to by his second name, if the third name is the patronymic. For example, Mohammed Hisyam bin Ariffin would be referred by the name Mr Hisyam, or Abdul Rahman bin Rasyid would be referred to as Mr Abdul Rahman.

It is argued that the Mr or Mrs form of address is not compatible with the Malay naming system, probably due to the lack of family or surnames. It is therefore customary to address Malays using the Malay forms of address (Encik or Puan/Cik).

Surnames

A few Malay families do use surnames, such as Abang, Awang, Tengku, Megat, Nik, Wan, Raja and Che, which are passed down patrilineally, while others such as Merican, Khan and Munsi indicate an Indian Muslim ancestry (since these names are Indian Muslim in origin). Other common surnames includes Sayid or Syed (of Arab ancestry), Teuku (of Aceh), Daeng (of Bugis origin), etc.

Honorifics
In olden times, the first group of Chinese people in Malaysia used to be held in high regard by Malays. Some Malays in the past may have taken the word "Baba", referring to Chinese males, and put it into their name, when this used to be the case. This is not followed by the younger generation, and the current Chinese Malaysians do not have the same status as they previously had.

Second personal names or double names
Another feature in Malay names, which is very common, is the existence of second personal names or double names. This seems to have been developed in response to the use of very popular Muslim names, like Muhammad and Ahmad for men, and Nur and Siti for women. Bearers of these names, and their variants, often add a more distinctive second name, like Muhammad Osman or Nur Mawar. The patronym is then added after these.

The popular first elements in double Malay male names are:
 Muhammad/Mohammad/Mohammed (often abbreviated to Muhd., Mohd., Md. or simply M.)
 Mat – the Malay variant of Muhammad. Mat is also the casual spoken form of names ending with -mad or -mat such as Ahmad, Rahmat, Samad, etc.
 Mamat - another variety of Muhammad
 Ahmad
 Awang (Commonly used in Brunei and Sarawak)
The most common first elements in double Malay female names are:
 Nur/Nurul/Noor/Nor
 Siti/Ct
 Dayang (Commonly used in Brunei and Sarawak)

A special case of double names for men is the use of Abdul. Following Arabic naming practices, Abdul simply means 'servant of' and must be followed by one of the names of God in the Qur'an; for example Abdul Haqq means 'servant of the Truth'.

Thus, Osman may have another son called Abdul Haqq, who is known as Abdul Haqq bin Osman, or Abdul Haqq Osman. Then he, in turn, may have a daughter called Nur Mawar, who is known as Nur Mawar binte Abdul Haqq, or Nor Mawar Abdul Haqq. It is often common to drop the first element in these double names, even if it is Abdul, and so the examples could be known as Haqq Osman and Mawar Haqq.

Malay titles

Hereditary titles
In different parts of Malaysia, traditionally inherited (patrilineally) Malay titles and sometimes matrilineally, are used and often incorporated into the naming system as the first part of double names. Most of those with these titles are descended from royalty or nobility.

The examples of inherited titles are:

by Patrilineal Royal descent (Malay)
 Tunku
 Tengku
 Raja
 Wan
by Patrilineal Royal descent (Malay - Mon-Khmer)
 Yang
 Long

by Patrilineal Royal descent (Acheh - Malay)
 Teuku

by Patrilineal Royal descent (Bugis - Malay)
 Daeng
 Daing

by Matrilineal Royal descent (Malay)
 Engku
 Cheku
 Ungku
 Megat (male)
 Puteri (female)
 Wan
 Nik

by Patrilineal and/or Matrilineal, Royal and/or Noble descent
 Syed/Sharifah (for male and female, respectively) — indicating direct patrilineal descent from the family of Muhammad.
 Mior (for male only) — indicating direct matrilineal descent from the family of Muhammad.
 Awangku/Pangiran/Pengiran, Dayangku (commonly found in Brunei and Sarawak, for male and female, denoting Bruneian-Malay aristocratic descent).
 Tuan (used more generally as a respectful term of address for men, like 'sir')
 Awang/Dayang, Abang/Dayang or Dayangku (used in Brunei and Sarawak, for male and female, respectively)

by Patrilineal Noble descent
 Wan
 Nik
 Che
 Tun
 Azmi

All hereditary titles are controlled and regulated as well as registered by the Malaysian National Registration Department and must appear in the National Registration Identity Cards (NRIC), passports as well as all official documents. A person may not in any circumstances be denied or stripped of his or her hereditary titles and persons with no evidence of inheritance are not allowed to carry these titles in accordance to local customs as well as the national registration naming regulations.

Non-hereditary titles
The titles above should not be confused with those given by special award which are non-hereditary, like 'Datuk', 'Tan Sri' and 'Tun'.

These titles are usually awarded by the Sultans of the recipients' respective states as well as the Yang Dipertuan Agong and the state Yang Dipertua as recognition for their contributions and services to the nation and the respective states. For example, the title 'Datuk' is given to Malaysians of all races as an honorary title. An example is Datuk Lee Chong Wei, a famous badminton player who was awarded the title as recognition to his achievement in becoming the third Malaysian to win a silver Olympic medal 2008 Beijing Summer Olympics. If the recipient is a man, his wife is automatically bestowed with the title 'Datin' but not in reverse.

The title 'Tun' is reserved for nationally important persons, like the fourth Prime Minister of Malaysia Tun Mahathir bin Mohamad. He was given the title after his resignation at 2003.

For an example of a complex name, one former Prime Minister of Malaysia has the full name Dato' Seri Mohd Najib bin Tun Haji Abdul Razak, where 'Dato' Seri' is a Malay title of honour, 'Mohd Najib' is his personal name (often further abbreviated to 'Najib'), 'bin' introduces his father's titles and names, Tun is a higher honour, 'Haji' denotes his father as a pilgrim to Mecca, and 'Abdul Razak' is his father's personal name (often abbreviated to Razak). The entire name has various shorter forms, like 'Mohd Najib Tun Abdul Razak', 'Najib Tun Razak' and 'Najib Razak').

Haji or Hajjah
If someone has been on the Hajj, the pilgrimage to Mecca, they may be called Haji for men or Hajjah for women. Thus, if Musa Bin Osman went on the Hajj, he could be called Haji Musa Bin Osman, and his daughter Aisyah might be called Aisyah Binti Haji Musa. If Aisyah herself have gone for the hajj, her name would be Hajjah Aisyah Binti Haji Musa. The titles can also be shortened in writing to 'Hj.' for Haji and 'Hjh' for Hajjah.

Chinese names

Traditional Chinese names are used among the Malaysian Chinese. These names are usually represented as three words, for example Foo Li Leen or Tan Ai Lin. The first is the Chinese family name, which is passed down from a father to all his children. The two other parts of the name form an indivisible Chinese given name, which may contain a generation name. In other cultures, the family name is sometimes shifted to the end of the name (for example, Li Leen Foo).

Some Chinese use a Western personal name (for example, Denise Foo), and some use this in preference to a Chinese given name. Most of these are used by Chinese Malaysian Christians, or Chinese who primarily speak English. On official documents, this name is either written in the order Western given name - surname - Chinese given name (e.g., Denise Foo Li Leen) or surname - Chinese given name - Western given name (e.g., Foo Li Leen Denise), or Western given name - Chinese given name - surname (e.g., Denise Li Leen Foo). In general practice, only one of the given names (the Western or Chinese name) is used. Chinese Malaysian Muslims may use Arabic given names while some use Arabic-derived Chinese names, e.g., Firdaus Fong Siew Chong.

As no formal system of romanisation is imposed on Chinese names in Malaysia at the time of birth registration, names are often romanised according to the judgment of the registration clerk or according to the preference of the proposer. Hence, romanisation errors are not uncommon resulting in unusual names. Since the 1980s, Pinyin names are becoming more common, although one would not say popular. The Pinyin form is based on Mandarin or Putonghua, whereas most existing romanised surnames are based on dialects. For example, a Tan (Fujian dialect) is Chen in the Pinyin form. In Fuzhou, the existing romanised form is Ding, both Tan and Ding are correct depending which sound they prefer as Chinese character have more than one pronunciation. As parents prefer their children to have the same romanised surname as their father, names such as Tan Jia Ling where Tan is in Hokkien and Jia Ling in Mandarin are becoming common.

Indian names 
Officially, Malaysian Indians use a patronymic naming system combining their traditional Indian names with some Malay words, while others use Tamil, Telugu, Malayalam, or Sanskrit names. A man's name would consist of his personal name followed by the Malay phrase anak lelaki, meaning 'son of', and then his father's name. A woman's name would consist of her personal name followed by the Malay phrase anak perempuan, meaning 'daughter of', and then her father's name. The Malay patronymic phrase is often abbreviated to a/l ('son of') or a/p ('daughter of') and then their father's name. In many circumstances, the intervening Malay is omitted, and the father's name follows immediately after a person's given name.

Following traditional practice from South India, the father's name is sometimes abbreviated to an initial and placed before the personal name. Thus, a man called Anbuselvan whose father is called Ramanan may be called Anbuselvan anak lelaki Ramanan (formal), Anbuselvan a/l Ramanan (as on his government identification card), Anbuselvan Ramanan or R. Anbuselvan. Whereas, his daughter Mathuram would be called Mathuram anak perempuan Anbuselvan (formal), Mathuram a/p Anbuselvan (as on her government identification card), Mathuram Anbuselvan or A. Mathuram. Although not recorded officially, an Indian woman may use her husband's personal name instead of her father's name after marriage.

Indian Malaysian Muslims, like ethnic Malays, use Arabic names or names of their own languages, while Arabic-derived Christian names may also be used by Indian Malaysian Christians.

Sikh Malaysian usage follows either the western fashion of personal names followed by the family name or more commonly the South Indian pattern with the personal name followed with the phrase "anak lelaki" (son of) for males and "anak perempuan (daughter of) for females. Examples of Sikh western-style usage where their full personal names followed by their family (or clan) name are: Harjit Singh Gill (for a male) or Harjit Kaur Gill (for a female). Examples of usage in the South Indian fashion would be: Harjit Singh a/l Jit Singh (for a male) and Harjit Kaur a/p Jit Singh.

Names of members of other groups

Peninsular Orang Asli and Sarawakian Bumiputra use the Malay word anak ('child of') to form their patronymics regardless of an individual's sex, for example, Sagong anak Tasi. However, most of the new generation indigenous people in Sabah and Sarawak who live in town areas and who practice Christianity as a religion, tend to have a Christian first name, for example Melissa Melanie Raweng (Raweng being the father's name).

Some Sabah and Sarawak Bumiputra have patronymics in the same fashion as Malays, using bin or binti, while others have patrilineal surnames which are handed down unchanged from generation to generation.

Minangkabau descendants use clan and tribal names passed down matrilineally.

Kristang people usually have Portuguese, or, at least, more European-sounding names, including inherited family names. In fact, Arabs and Portuguese have common denominator in influence in names: Fatima, Omar, and Soraya. These names are common in Portugal given by Arab influence.

See also
Malay styles and titles

References

Name, Malaysian
Names by culture